Savant is a fictional superhero appearing in American comic books published by DC Comics, depicted as a member of the Birds of Prey and the Suicide Squad.

The character made his cinematic debut in the DC Extended Universe film The Suicide Squad, portrayed by Michael Rooker.

Fictional character biography
Brian Durlin, better known as Savant, is the spoiled heir to an enormous fortune. Savant had moved to Gotham City to become a self-styled vigilante. However, after Batman discouraged his involvement in vigilantism because of his lack of care to protect others, he turned his own formidable computer skills into a profitable blackmailing business. Savant was joined in this by an ex-Russian KGB agent named Creote.

Savant later kidnapped  Black Canary in hopes to get the real identity of Batman from Oracle. However, he was soon defeated by her team. Oracle then made the decision to attempt to rehabilitate him, mainly in order to keep his data files on hundreds of real villains. Like his namesake, he is a genius; however, due to a chemical imbalance he exhibits a non-linear memory and seems to be quite forgetful. Savant has also exhibited feelings for Oracle, probably rooted in his envy of her computer skills. 

Savant went on, under Oracle's control, to clean up a Gotham neighborhood. However his unique methods led Oracle to regret her decision. Savant and Creote then joined forces with Huntress to take over the Gotham mafia by placing Huntress as capo.

As part of a plan by Calculator to get to Oracle, Savant was kidnapped and tortured by agents of the Secret Society of Super Villains. His non-linear memory helped him to resist the interrogation, making it appear to last only a few hours rather than the days it had really been. He was rescued by the Birds of Prey and out of anger pushed the villain Black Spider out of a window. Spider survived, meaning the Birds did not have to arrest Savant for murder, though he did end his association with Oracle.

He and Creote turn up alongside dozens of former Birds of Prey and friends of Barbara to confront Spy Smasher.

He is one of the villains sent to retrieve the Get Out of Hell free card from the Secret Six.

Savant is seemingly attacked and murdered by The White Canary. After a failed attempt to keep him alive, a grieving Creote blames Oracle for this and shoots himself. It later turns out that they both faked their deaths. They later appear in Oracle's base and abduct her, planning for her to reveal her secret identity to the world. They take Oracle to the top of the Gotham Dam, where Savant reveals that his distorted sense of time means that his torture at the hands of the Secret Society feels like it only happened five minutes ago and that he has been in constant mental agony for two years. He then reveals that the true purpose of bringing Oracle out to the dam was to have her witness his suicide and attempts to throw himself off the dam, but Oracle leaps from her chair and stops him, convincing Creote to help pull them up despite his promise to let Savant die. She then explains to a confused Savant that Creote is in love with him. Creote later admits his feelings to Savant, who to his surprise reciprocates.

Savant and Creote were offered positions in the Birds of Prey by Oracle yet again, Savant on technical staff, Creote as a bodyguard. Recently, Savant has appeared in a meeting with the Calculator to have faked his breakdown to infiltrate Oracle's operation. However, it is later apparent in a meeting with Oracle and Batman that he is a double agent for the Birds of Prey, to feed Calculator information that would ultimately allow the Birds to successfully fake the death of Oracle. The brief encounter with Batman revealed that neither of them has forgotten their previous hostility towards the other.

In September 2011, DC Comics rebooted the continuity of its fictional universe in an initiative known as The New 52. In this new timeline, Savant is reintroduced as a member of Amanda Waller's new Suicide Squad. As part of an effort to weed out the weak link in the group, the candidates are tortured, with Savant eventually cracking under the pressure and betraying the group. He is dragged away and seemingly killed, but his fate is left uncertain.

Powers and abilities
Savant possesses genius-level intellect. He is an expert at martial arts, computer operation, and multilingualism.

Weakness
Savant exhibits forgetfulness due to neuro-chemical imbalance; because of said-chemical imbalance, he exhibits a non-linear memory; his recollection of events does not occur in their linear-order; once, when kidnapped and tortured, Savant's non-linear memory helped him to resist the interrogation, making it appear to last only a few hours rather than the days it had really been; later, because of his distorted sense of time, his torture at the hands of the Secret Society feels like it only happened five minutes ago and he was in constant mental agony for two years.

In other media
 Savant appears in The Suicide Squad, portrayed by Michael Rooker. This version is a war veteran who was convicted of blackmail. He is recruited into the eponymous team to destroy a Corto Maltese prison called Jötunheim. However, his PTSD flares up after witnessing most of his team get killed in a battle with the local military and attempts to flee, leading to Amanda Waller executing him via an explosive device implanted in his skull.

References

Comics characters introduced in 2003
Characters created by Gail Simone
DC Comics LGBT superheroes
DC Comics male superheroes
DC Comics martial artists
Fictional characters with memory disorders
Fictional blackmailers
Fictional bisexual males
Fictional hackers
Russian superheroes
Suicide Squad members
Vigilante characters in comics